Benoît Dauga (8 May 1942 – 3 November 2022) was a French rugby union footballer. He played as a lock and as number eight.

Dauga played for Stade Montois. He had 63 caps for the France national team, from 1964 to 1972, scoring 11 tries, 34 points on aggregate. He captained France on nine occasions. He was a part of the French team that won a Grand Slam in the Five Nations in 1968, as well as the championship wins in 1967 and 1970.

References

External links
  Benoît Dauga on FFR.fr
 Benoît Dauga on scrum.com

1942 births
2022 deaths
French rugby union players
Rugby union locks
Stade Montois players
France international rugby union players
Sportspeople from Landes (department)
Chevaliers of the Légion d'honneur